Guillaume Cros (born 19 April 1995) is a French professional footballer who plays as a left-back for RCO Agde.

Club career
Cros is a youth exponent from FC Sochaux-Montbéliard. He made his Ligue 2 debut at the opening day of the 2014–15 season against US Orléans.

In the 2015–16 season he played for fifth-tier club RCO Agde, near his hometown Béziers.

On 22 July 2016, he moved to Germany signing for Regionalliga Nordost side FC Carl Zeiss Jena having previously trialled with the club. On 30 January 2019, he agreed the termination of his contract with the club after he had previously stated he would not renew his contract.

A day later, on the last day of 2018–19 winter transfer window, Cros joined F.C. Hansa Rostock, league rivals of Jena in the 3. Liga. He agreed a half-year contract with the option of a further season.

References

External links
 
 
 

Living people
1995 births
Association football defenders
French footballers
France youth international footballers
Ligue 2 players
3. Liga players
Regionalliga players
AS Béziers (2007) players
FC Sochaux-Montbéliard players
RCO Agde players
FC Carl Zeiss Jena players
FC Hansa Rostock players
French expatriate footballers
French expatriate sportspeople in Germany
Expatriate footballers in Germany